Giuliano Modica (born 12 March 1991) is an Argentine former professional footballer who played as a defender.

References

External links
 

Argentine footballers
1991 births
Living people
Association football defenders
1. FC Kaiserslautern II players
Eintracht Frankfurt II players
Kickers Offenbach players
Dynamo Dresden players
1. FC Kaiserslautern players
SV Wehen Wiesbaden players
1. FSV Mainz 05 II players
2. Bundesliga players
3. Liga players
Regionalliga players
Argentine expatriate sportspeople in Germany
Expatriate footballers in Germany
Footballers from Córdoba, Argentina